This is a list of the 12 members to the European Parliament for Croatia in the 2009 to 2014 session. They were elected on 14 April 2013, in what was the first European Parliament election in Croatia, and took office on 1 July.

List

Source: Večernji list

Party representation

References

2013
List
Croatia